Bhalla may refer to:

 Bhalla, Karnal in Haryana, India
 Bhalla (food), a snack from India
 Bhalla, Jammu and Kashmir, a village in Jammu and Kashmir

People

 Ashima Bhalla, Indian actress
 Attin Bhalla, Indian actor
 Deepti Omchery Bhalla, Indian dancer
 Gopi Bhalla, Indian actor
 Harbans Bhalla, Indian writer
 Jaswinder Bhalla, Indian comedian and actor
Needhi Bhalla, American biologist
 Vikas Bhalla, Indian actor and producer